Alessandro Feridun Hojabrpour (born January 10, 2000) is a Canadian professional soccer player who plays as a central midfielder for Canadian Premier League side Forge FC.

Club career

Early career
A product of the Vancouver Whitecaps FC Academy, Alessandro Hojabrpour signed with the under-19 side of Bulgarian club Lokomotiv Plovdiv in 2017.

Pacific FC
Hojabrpour signed with Pacific FC on January 15, 2019, and made his Canadian Premier League debut on May 12, 2019, against FC Edmonton. He was given his first start for the club in the next game during a Canadian Championship match against Cavalry FC on May 15, 2019. Hojabrpour re-signed with Pacific in December 2019 for the 2020 season and in December 2020 for the 2021 season. 

During the 2021 Canadian Premier League season, Hojabrpour provided his first assist for the club on July 17 to Josh Heard against Forge FC. He scored his first goal for Pacific on October 6 against FC Edmonton at Clarke Stadium. Hojabrpour helped Pacific reach their first CPL final on November 20, 2021, after a 2–1 extra time win over Cavalry FC at ATCO Field. On December 4, 2021, he was nominated for the league's under-21 player of the year award at the end of the 2021 season. On December 5, 2021, Hojabrpour scored the winning goal to win Pacific the 2021 Canadian Premier League Final at Tim Hortons Field. On December 14, he was named the 2021 Under-21 player of the year. In January 2022, Pacific announced Hojabrpour would be departing the club.

Forge FC
On January 7, 2022, Pacific FC announced that Hojabrpour had left the club to sign with fellow Canadian Premier League side Forge FC ahead of the 2022 Canadian Premier League season. Forge officially confirmed the signing the following week. Hojabrpour made his club debut on February 16, 2022, in a CONCACAF Champions League match against Liga MX side Cruz Azul. He scored his first goal for Forge on April 16, 2022, in their 2022 home opener against Cavalry FC. On October 23, 2022, Hojabrpour provided an assist in the semifinal to help Forge reach the 2022 Canadian Premier League Final. On October 30, 2022, Hojabrpour scored in the final for his second consecutive championship-winning goal of the Canadian Premier League Finals and thereby helping Forge win the 2022 championship.

International career

Youth
Born in Burnaby to an Italian mother and Iranian father, Hojabrpour made his debut in the Canadian youth program in 2014. He represented the Canada men's national under-17 soccer team in the 2017 CONCACAF U-17 Championship, scoring a goal against Cuba on April 25, 2017.

Style of play

Hojabrpour can operate as a central midfielder or defensive midfielder. He has been praised for his defensive abilities and reliability in midfield.

Career statistics

Honours

Club
Pacific FC
Canadian Premier League: 2021

Forge FC
Canadian Premier League: 2022

Individual
Canadian Premier League Best Under 21 Canadian Player of the Year: 2021

References

External links
Canada Soccer profile

2000 births
Living people
Association football midfielders
Canadian soccer players
Iranian footballers
Soccer people from British Columbia
Sportspeople from Burnaby
Canadian people of Italian descent
Canadian people of Iranian descent
Sportspeople of Iranian descent
Canadian expatriate soccer players
Expatriate footballers in Bulgaria
Canadian expatriate sportspeople in Bulgaria
Vancouver Whitecaps Residency players
PFC Lokomotiv Plovdiv players
Pacific FC players
Forge FC players
Canadian Premier League players
Canada men's youth international soccer players